La Roche-sur-Foron station is a railway station in the commune of La Roche-sur-Foron, in the French department of Haute-Savoie. It is located at the junction of the standard gauge Aix-les-Bains–Annemasse and La Roche-sur-Foron–Saint-Gervais-les-Bains-Le Fayet lines of SNCF.

Services 
 the following services stop at La Roche-sur-Foron:

 TER Auvergne-Rhône-Alpes: rush-hour service between Annecy and Saint-Gervais-les-Bains-Le Fayet.

References

External links 
 
 

Roche-sur-Foron